The Maritime-Hockey North Junior C Championship are the Junior "C" ice hockey championships for the Maritime Junior "C" leagues and Hockey North's Team Nunavut of the Canadian Territory of Nunavut.

History
The championship was officially adopted by Hockey Canada during a summer meeting in 2002.

The first ever Maritime-North Championship was won by the Chebucto Canadians of Nova Scotia in the Spring of 2003. Chebucto defeated the Dieppe/Memramcook Voyageurs of the New Brunswick Junior C Hockey League 4–3 in triple overtime to win the title.

On April 14, 2012, the tenth anniversary of the tournament, Nunavut's Kivalliq Canucks defeated Prince Edward Island's Pownal Red Wings 3–1 to become the first Hockey North-based team in the tournament's history to make the final. Kivalliq would eventually lose the final 7–3 to Nova Scotia's Chester Clippers.

The 2015 tournament in Sherwood, Prince Edward Island marked the first time in tournament history that neither team in the final represented New Brunswick or Nova Scotia. Baffin made the final by upsetting New Brunswick's Western Valley Panthers while PEI's South Side Lynx beat Nova Scotia's Truro Rhinos to reach the championship game. This would mark only the second time a Hockey North team made the final and the first time ever a PEI team had made it. Baffin led 6-1 early in the second, only to have South Side battle back to within one goal. Baffin won the game 6–5 to win Nunavut's first Maritime-Hockey North junior hockey title.

2019 competition
{| cellpadding="0" 
|- align="left" style="vertical-align: top" 
| 
|

Results
March 27
Kivalliq 1 vs. Tri-County 3
Spryfield 3 vs. Western Valley 7

March 28
Tignish 0 vs. Tri-County 5
Western Valley 1 vs. Kivalliq 2
Tignish 6 vs. Spryfield 3
Western Valley 8 vs. Tri-County 0

March 29
Kivalliq 5 vs. Tignish 4 (OT)
Tri-County 6 vs. Spryfield 1
Western Valley 6 vs. Tignish 4
Spryfield 4 vs. Kivalliq 6

March 30
Semi-final: Tri-County 7 vs. Tignish 1
Semi-final: Kivalliq 1 vs. Western Valley 5

March 30
Final: Tri-County 2 vs. Western Valley 1 (OT)

Competing leagues

Hockey North
New Brunswick Junior B Hockey League
Nova Scotia Regional Junior C Hockey League
Prince Edward Island Junior C Hockey League

Champions
{| cellpadding="0" 
|- align="left" style="vertical-align: top" 
| 
|

References

External links
 Maritime-Hockey North Junior Championship

Ice hockey tournaments in Canada
Canadian ice hockey trophies and awards